Kalamazoo? is a 2006 American comedy film, directed by David O'Malley and starring Josie Davis, Mayim Bialik and Joanna Clare Scott, who also wrote the screenplay. The movie was filmed entirely in Kalamazoo, Michigan.

Plot
Carol (Josie Davis), Maggie (Mayim Bialik) and Joan (Joanna Clare Scott) are three friends who took different ways in their lives. The girls go back to Kalamazoo, Michigan for their 10-year high school reunion, but they discovered that a time capsule placed on their graduation night containing predictions would be opened in one week. Horrified at the thought of having their unfulfilled goals made public, they decide to steal the time capsule and destroy it. But they have to deal with the life they left behind, including former loves and family.

Cast
Mayim Bialik as Maggie Goldman
Josie Davis as Carol Cavanaugh
Joanna Clare Scott as Joan Branson
Claire Bloom as Eleanor
Chita Rivera as Giannina
Renée Taylor as Golda
Steven Roy as Paul
Nathan Anderson as Stephen
Larry Sullivan as Nate
Joanne Baron as Mrs. Goldman 
Dee Wallace as Susan
Michael Boatman as Albert

Personnel
Adapted from Cine TVX.

 David O'Malley – director, executive producer
 Joanna Clare Scott – screenwriter, producer
 Dana E. Kowalski – screenwriter
 Isabel Holtreman – screenwriter

References

External links
Official Movie site

2006 films
2006 comedy films
2000s English-language films
Films directed by David O'Malley